Lewis Paul Bamford is a Welsh football midfielder who plays for Cinderford Town.

Career
Bamford was born in Newport and started his football career in the Newport County A.F.C. academy. He made his senior debut for Newport in their League Two match against Dagenham & Redbridge on 19 September 2015 as a second-half substitute. The match ended in a 0–0 draw.

In December 2016 Newport County confirmed Bamford would be released by Newport at the conclusion of his contract on 31 January 2017.

In 2017 Bamford joined Cinderford Town, who play in the Southern League Division One South.

In 2018 he switched to Cinderford's division rivals, Bristol Manor Farm.

References

External links

Living people
Footballers from Newport, Wales
1997 births
Welsh footballers
English Football League players
Association football midfielders
Newport County A.F.C. players